The Convention for the Suppression of the Illicit Traffic in Dangerous Drugs was a drug control treaty signed in 1936.

Harry Anslinger - representing the United States - attempted to add provisions to criminalize all activities. Such activities included the cultivation, production, manufacture and distribution, as well as the use of opium, coca (and its derivatives) and cannabis for non-medical and non-scientific purposes. Other countries objected to this proposal, so the Convention's focus remained on trafficking. The U.S. considered the final treaty to be too weak, and refused to sign it, fearing that it might have to weaken its own controls to comply with the treaty. The Convention therefore had little effect, although it was the first treaty to make certain drug offenses international crimes; all previous treaties had dealt with regulating licit drug activity.

References
Ratifications .
Cannabis: Our Position for a Canadian Public Policy, Report of the Senate Special Committee on Illegal Drugs, September 2002.
Evolution of international drug control, 1945-1995, Bulletin on Narcotics, 1999.
 www.druglibrary.org

Treaties concluded in 1936
Treaties entered into force in 1939
Drug control treaties
1936 in cannabis
Cannabis law
League of Nations treaties
Treaties of Austria
Treaties of Belgium
Treaties of the Second Brazilian Republic
Treaties of the French protectorate of Cambodia
Treaties of Cameroon
Treaties of Canada
Treaties of Chile
Treaties of the Republic of China (1912–1949)
Treaties of Colombia
Treaties of Ivory Coast
Treaties of Cuba
Treaties of the Dominican Republic
Treaties of the Kingdom of Egypt
Treaties of the Ethiopian Empire
Treaties of the French Fourth Republic
Treaties of the Kingdom of Greece
Treaties of Haiti
Treaties of British India
Treaties of Indonesia
Treaties of Italy
Treaties of Israel
Treaties of Japan
Treaties of Jordan
Treaties of the Kingdom of Laos
Treaties of Liechtenstein
Treaties of Luxembourg
Treaties of Madagascar

Treaties of Malawi
Treaties of Mexico
Treaties of the Socialist Republic of Romania
Treaties of Rwanda
Treaties of Francoist Spain
Treaties of the Dominion of Ceylon
Treaties of Switzerland
Treaties of Turkey
1936 in Switzerland